Urophora grindeliae is a species of tephritid or fruit flies in the genus Urophora of the family Tephritidae.

Distribution
United States.

References

Urophora
Insects described in 1908
Diptera of North America